The 1st German Antique Police Car Museum (German - 1. Deutsche Polizeioldtimer-Museum) is a museum of historic German police vehicles in the Wehrshausen district of the German city of Marburg.

It was established on 24 June 2000 as part of the tenth anniversary celebrations by the Polizei-Motorsport-Club Marburg 1990 e. V.., with the Hessian Interior Minister Volker Bouffier as its patron. Collecting historic vehicles was originally a side-aspect of the Club - it made its first acquisition in 1991, a 1950s Opel Rekord P1. The museum building was officially opened on 12 July 2003 and since then it has been open from April to October, usually on Sundays.

Collections

References

External links 

  Official website
  Diese Autos sind (fast) alle Filmstars; Report on the museum by Bild.de (with video)
  Die Entstehungsgeschichte des Museums - flyer for the museum

Automobile museums in Germany
Law enforcement museums in Germany
Museums in Marburg
2000 establishments in Germany
Museums established in 2000